Jan Phillip Eißfeldt (born 25 August 1976), known professionally as Jan Delay, is a German rapper and singer whose stylistic range includes mainly hip hop, reggae, dub and funk. An accomplished solo artist, he became known to the public as a member of the German bands Absolute Beginner and La Boom. He performed with his group 'Disko No. 1' at the grand final of the Eurovision Song Contest 2011 in Düsseldorf.

Early life 
Delay was born in Hamburg on 25 August 1976. He attended the bilingual Helene-Lange-Gymnasium from 1986 to 1995.

Career 

In the 1990s, Delay became known as one third of the pioneering German hip hop group Beginner. His stage name is a reference to Young Deenay, a pop music act in the 90s: the delay/echo is an important effect in reggae and dancehall music.

Delay's most significant trademark is his somewhat nasal voice. He also frequently changes his stage name depending on his current music style, mood and collaboration partners. Bald, he often wears a hat and sunglasses.

Eimsbush label 
In 1997, Delay founded his own record label Eimsbush together with partners from the Hamburg hip-hop scene. The label's main goal was to support and guide fresh underground talents and pave their way into the music business without having them "selling out" to the major labels. The label was initiated by the German hip hop scene while it was going through a boom phase in the mid and late 90s, which led to "every Horst [jerk] being allowed to rap if only he can hold up a mic" (Jan Delay, MTV Germany, 2007). As a result, real talent stepped back for fear of being seen as sellouts by the underground hip-hop scene.

The label was shut down in 2003 due to financial reasons and as a result of the "naive idea of just believing in talent outside the mainstream"

Discography

Albums 
 2001 – Searching for the Jan Soul Rebels
 2006 – Mercedes Dance
 2007 – Searching – the Dubs
 2007 – Mercedes Dance – Live
 2009 – Wir Kinder vom Bahnhof Soul (GER: 23rd best-selling album of 2009)
 2010 – Wir Kinder vom Bahnhof Soul – Live
 2014 – Hammer & Michel
 2021 – Earth, Wind & Feiern

Singles 
 1999 – "Irgendwie, irgendwo, irgendwann" (cover version of Nena's song of the same name)
 2001 – "Ich möchte nicht, dass ihr meine Lieder singt"
 2001 – "Vergiftet"
 2002 – "Die Welt steht still" (Sam Ragga Band featuring Jan Delay)
 2006 – "Klar"
 2006 – "Für immer und dich"
 2007 – "Feuer"
 2007 – "Im Arsch" (featuring Udo Lindenberg)
 2007 – "Türlich, Türlich" / Word up
 2008 – "Ganz anders" (featuring Udo Lindenberg)
 2009 – "Oh Jonny"
 2009 – "Disko"
 2010 – "Hoffnung"
 2014 – "Liebe"
 2014 – "St. Pauli"
 2014 – "Sie kann nicht tanzen"
 2018 – "Grün-weiße Liebe"
 2021 – "Intro"
 2021 – "Eule" (featuring Marteria)
 2021 – "Spass" (featuring Denyo)

External links 

 Official website
 Jan Delay on laut.de (in German)

1976 births
Living people
21st-century German male singers
Participants in the Bundesvision Song Contest
German rappers
German reggae musicians
Musicians from Hamburg